Danijel Brezič (born 15 February 1976 in Murska Sobota) is a Slovenian football midfielder, who last played for Grazer AK in the Austrian Regional League Central.

He previously played for R.W.D. Molenbeek in the Belgian First Division.

Honours

Mura Murska Sobota
Slovenian Cup: 1994–95

Rudar Velenje
Slovenian Cup: 1997–98

Maribor
Slovenian PrvaLiga: 2002–03
Slovenian Cup: 2003–04

Domžale
Slovenian PrvaLiga: 2007–08
Slovenian Supercup: 2007

See also
List of NK Maribor players

References

External links
Player profile at PrvaLiga 

1976 births
Living people
People from Murska Sobota
Slovenian footballers
Association football midfielders
Slovenian PrvaLiga players
Slovenian expatriate footballers
Slovenian expatriate sportspeople in Austria
Expatriate footballers in Austria
NK Mura players
NK Rudar Velenje players
R.W.D. Molenbeek players
NK Maribor players
NK Celje players
NK Domžale players
NK IB 1975 Ljubljana players
SC Austria Lustenau players
Slovenia international footballers